Neelakkuyil was an Indian Malayalam-language television soap opera drama directed by Biju Varghese. The show  premiered on Asianet channel and streaming on Disney+ Hotstar from 26 February 2018. It is the remake of Star Jalsha's Ishti Kutum.

This serial is remade into Tamil in the name Neelakuyil which was being aired on Star Vijay. Neelakuyil is the love story of Adhi and Rani. On other side Kasthoori is another girl who was suffering with poverty was entered accidentally to their life. Nithin Jake Joseph, Latha Sangaraju and Snisha Chandran plays the lead roles. Telugu actress Latha replaced instead of Pavani Reddy by making her debut in Malayalam television.

Plot
The story revolves around the life of a tribal love-child Kasthuri from a secluded region called Poompara in rural Kerala. Kasthuri is brought up by her mother Cheeru and stepfather Massy who is also a tribal activist and leader.

A famous journalist, Aditya, visits Poompara to interview Massy. One stormy night Kasthuri is forced to spend the night in the Tourist Lodge in Aditya's room. Though both are innocent, the locals force Aditya to marry Kasthuri. Aditya, previously engaged to his girlfriend Rani in the city, refuses to recognise the ceremony and asks Kasthuri to decide what she wants to do. Kasthuri then comes to Kerala with Aditya as a maidservant. She begins to study in the city. Gradually, she becomes comfortable and happy in the city, living with the Aditya's family, who also begin to love her cheerful ways.

Initially, Aditya thinks of Kasthuri as a nuisance. He continues his engagement to Rani, a college professor, whose father Sharatchandra "Chandru", also happens to be Kasthuri's biological father. Aditya slowly falls in love with Kasthuri, realising he considers Rani merely a close friend. An unhappy Rani tries to commit suicide but eventually divorces Aditya and arranges for his wedding to Kasthuri. However, the plans are foiled.

Kasthuri continues her studies and performs brilliantly. Rani's mother, Radhamani attempts to murder Kasthuri out of rage, aware of the fact that her husband is Kasthuri's father. Rani forces Chandru to accept Kasthuri as his daughter. Chandru regrets his past behavior and tries to build a relationship with Kasthuri.

Sharan, a lawyer, falls in love with Rani. Rani takes his help in getting bail for Massy,Finding a good friend in Sharan. But Rani doesn't have an idea about Sharan's thought, because she still madly loves Adhitya. However, the alliance is broken.

Rani becomes disheartened. Aditya narrates his story of how Kasthuri's villagers forced him to marry. Rani dismisses him at first, however, she realises that she shouldn't have been too harsh with Aditya. She accepts Kasthuri as her own sister and happily marries Aditya. Radhamani too realise her mistake. The series ends with a happy note as Aditya and Rani's family plans to get Kasthuri married to a good person.

Cast

Main cast
 Nithin Jake Joseph as Jrn. Adhithyan (Adhi): Rani's husband, Kasthoori's brother in law and ex-husband.
 Pavani Reddy / Latha Sangaraju as Rani Adhithyan: Adhi's wife and Kasthoori's sister
 Snisha Chandran as Dr. Kasthoori: Adhi's sister in law and ex-wife, Rani's sister

Recurring cast
 Anil Mohan as Arst. Sharath Chandran, Sharath: Rani's and Kasthoori's father
 Rashmi Hari Prasad as Radhamani Sharath Chandran: Rani's mother
 KPAC Saji as Balanandhan, Balan: Adhi's father
 M. R. Gopakumar as Retired Captain Chandrasenan, Valyachan: Adhi's uncle
 Sabitha Nair as Vasandhi: Adhi's mother
 Raji.P.Menon as Chandramathi, Valyamma: Adhi's aunt
 Meenakshi Nair/Caroline Ancy as Swathi: Adhi's cousin
 Prabha Shankar as Dr Raveendran, Ravi: Adhi's uncle
 Bindu Krishna as Malini: Adhi's aunt
 Sangeetha Sivan as Shari: Rani's and Kasthoori's aunt
 Anandavally/ Geetha Nair as Muthassi: Rani's and Kasthoori's grandmother
 Hari as Adv.Saran: Shari's relative and Rani's friend
 Amal Rajdev as Maasi
 Ruthu as Cheeru: Kasthoori's mother

Awards and ratings
Janmabhumi Television Awards 2019
 Best Serial
 Best Actress - Snisha Chandran
 Best Director - Manju Dharman

12th Asianet Television Awards 2019
 Most Popular Serial
 Best Newface Male - Nithin Jake Joseph
 Best New face female - Snisha Chandran
 Best Actor Character Role - Gopakumar
 Best Writer - Pradeep Kavumthara

Gramadharavu Excellecncy Awards2020
 Best Actor - Nithin Jake Joseph
 Best Actress - Latha SangaRaju
 Best Star pair - Nithin Jake Joseph and Latha Sangaraju

This is the second top rated serial in Malayalam television with 4.80 million impressions (Week 05, 2019) following Vanambadi, according to BARC India. The TRP Ratings of months of January 2019 and December 2018 are shown.

January 2019

References

External links 
 Official website on Hotstar

Indian television series
Indian television soap operas
Serial drama television series
2018 Indian television series debuts
Malayalam-language television shows
Indian drama television series
Asianet (TV channel) original programming